

Johann Jakob Jung (12 September 1819, Frankfurt am Main - 29 June 1844, Frankfurt am Main) was a German painter, specializing in religious subjects, and a member of the Nazarene movement.

Life and work 
In 1834, he took lessons in painting from Philipp Veit at the  Städelsches Kunstinstitut, where Veit was Director of the museum's gallery. At this time, Frankfurt had become the focal point for the Nazarene movement, which was devoted to religious art, largely of a Catholic nature. This had a decisive influence on the content of Jung's works.

The most familiar of these are oil paintings depicting Louis the Pious, Arnulf of Carinthia and Louis the Child. These may be seen at the Kaisersaal in the Römer, a medieval building in Frankfurt. He also created a portrait of Saint Cecilia in 1842.

That same year, he accepted a position as an art teacher at the Städel. His best known student there was Anton Burger.

In 2003, a set of his drawings of camellias was offered at the auction house, Christie’s, in London and went for $245,584.

References

Further reading 
 "Jung, Jacob". In: Friedrich von Boetticher: Malerwerke des 19. Jahrhunderts. Beitrag zur Kunstgeschichte. Vols.1/2, Boetticher’s Verlag, Dresden 1895, pg.600 
 Heinrich Weizsäcker, Albert Dessoff: "Kunst und Künstler in Frankfurt am Main". Verlag Baer, Frankfurt/M. Vol.1: Das Frankfurter Kunstleben im 19. Jahrhundert in seinen grundlegenden Zügen geschildert. 1907, pg.162 (Online)
 "Jung, Jakob (1819)". In: Hans Vollmer (Ed.): Allgemeines Lexikon der Bildenden Künstler von der Antike bis zur Gegenwart. Vol.19: Ingouville–Kauffungen. E. A. Seemann, Leipzig 1926, pg.32

External links

1819 births
1844 deaths
19th-century German painters
19th-century German male artists
Religious artists
Nazarene painters
Artists from Frankfurt